Nina Pens Rode (22 May 1929 – 22 July 1992), was a Danish actress best known for her 1964 performance in the title role in Gertrud, Carl Theodor Dreyer's final film. Previous to this, she appeared in five other Danish films: Kispus (1956), Arvingen (1954), Husmandstøsen (1952), Kærlighedsdoktoren (1952), and Dorte (1951). Rode made her stage debut at the Odense Theatre in 1947. She was married to the actor Ebbe Rode from 1959 until her death in 1992 at the age of 63.

References

External links

Danish film actresses
People from Kongens Lyngby
1929 births
1992 deaths
20th-century Danish actresses